Judy Santos may refer to:
 Judy Santos (singer), American singer
 Judy Ann Santos, Filipina actress and television host